Chubanlar (also Romanized as Chūbānlār; also known as Chūpānlār and Chūpānlār-e Ḩoseynkalū) is a village in Owch Hacha Rural District, in the Central District of Ahar County, East Azerbaijan Province, Iran. At the 2006 census, its population was 84, in 17 families.

References 

Populated places in Ahar County